Bad Zell is a municipality in the district of Freistadt in the Austrian state of Upper Austria.

Population

References

Cities and towns in Freistadt District
Spa towns in Austria